The 1976–77 FA Cup was the 96th staging of the world's oldest football knockout competition, The Football Association Challenge Cup, or FA Cup.  The final saw Manchester United beat Liverpool 2–1.

First round proper

Teams from the Football League Third and Fourth Division entered in this round plus Scarborough, Stafford Rangers, Wigan Athletic and Wimbledon were given byes. The first round of games were played on 20 November 1976. Replays were played mainly on 22–24, with some on 29 November, and 2 and 6 December.

Second round proper
The second round of games were mainly played on 11 December 1976, with some taking place midweek over 14–15 December and one on 20th. Replays took place on 14th or 21st.

Third round proper
Teams from the Football League First and Second Division entered in this round. The third round of games in the FA Cup were played on 8 January 1977. Replays were mainly played midweek over 10–12 January or the week after but one occurred on 24th instead.

Fourth round proper
The fourth round of games were played on 29 January 1977. Four games required a replay, played midweek on 1–2 February.

Fifth round proper
The fifth set of games took place on 26 February 1977. One game went to a replay which was played on 8 March. Holders Southampton were eliminated by Manchester United in a rematch of the previous final.

Sixth round proper
The sixth round of FA Cup games were played on 19 March 1977. There were no replays.

Semi-finals

Semi-final 1

Replay

Semi-final 2

Final

TV coverage

The right to show FA Cup games were, as with Football League matches, shared between the BBC and ITV network. All games were shown in a highlights format, except the Final, which was shown live both on BBC1 and ITV. The BBC football highlights programme Match of the Day would show up to three games and the various ITV regional network stations would cover up to one game and show highlights from other games covered elsewhere on the ITV network. No games from Rounds 1 or 2 were shown. Highlights of replays would be shown on either the BBC or ITV. The BBC were only able to cover one of the three planned Fifth round ties due to a cameraman strike.

Third round BBC: Southampton v Chelsea, Cardiff City v Tottenham Hotspur, Blackpool v Derby County, Derby County v Blackpool (Midweek replay) ITV: Leeds United v Norwich City (Yorkshire & Anglia), Wimbledon v Middlesbrough (LWT & Tyne-Tees), Everton v Stoke City (Granada), Leicester v Aston Villa (ATV), Chelsea v Southampton (Midweek replay All regions)

Fourth round BBC: Colchester United v Derby County, Cardiff City v Wrexham, Manchester United v Queens Park Rangers, Derby County v Colchester United (Midweek Replay) ITV: Swindon Town v Everton (HTV & Granada), Arsenal v Coventry City (LWT), Ipswich Town v Wolverhampton Wanderers (Anglia), Birmingham City v Leeds United (ATV & Yorkshire)

Fifth round BBC: Leeds United v Manchester City, Manchester United v Southampton (Midweek Replay) ITV: Southampton v Manchester United (Southern & LWT), Middlesbrough v Arsenal (Tyne-Tees & Yorkshire), Liverpool v Oldham Athletic (Granada), Aston Villa v Port Vale (ATV)

Sixth round BBC: Manchester United v Aston Villa, Everton v Derby County ITV: Liverpool v Middlesbrough (Granada & Tyne-Tees), Wolverhampton Wanderers v Leeds United (ATV & Yorkshire) All ITV regions showed these two games

Semi-finals BBC: Everton v Liverpool, Everton v Liverpool (Midweek replay) ITV: Leeds United v Manchester United Shown in all ITV regions

Final Liverpool v Manchester United Shown live by both BBC & ITV

References
 FA Cup Results Archive
 
 

 
FA Cup seasons
Fa
Eng